In Romanian primary schools, a 4-point grading scale is used:

Foarte Bine (FB, very good)
Bine (B, good)
Suficient/Satisfăcător (S, pass)
Insuficient/Nesatisfăcător (I, fail)

In secondary schools, high schools, and universities, a 10-point scale is used, 5 being the minimum grade for passing.

Specifications such as + and −, half grades, and grades like 6/7 are sometimes used. Note that the grades used in primary school are derived from this scale, with Insufficient meaning "4 or less", and the other grades standing for 5-6, 7-8 and 9-10 respectively. A 10 is not an uncommon grade, especially in low-interest subjects. A 9 is usually considered an excellent grade. The average grade ranges between 7 and 8. A very poor performance is usually awarded a 3 or 4, while a 1 is often reserved for cases of academic dishonesty or some other unacceptable behavior. Grades with 2 decimal digits can also be awarded, e.g. 7.38 means "'very' satisfactory", although in the register (catalog, where grades are written) the grade will be rounded. Grades with 2 decimal digits can also be awarded in certificates of final examinations in secondary schools, but in that case, they are not rounded. 

The same system (10-point scale) is used in Moldova, Finland and Vietnam, including in primary school. However, in Finland all grades lower than 4 have been consolidated into a grade of 4.

References

https://www.uoradea.ro/display2268

External links
About ECTS credits

Romania
Grading
Grading